Gabellini is an Italian surname. Notable people with the surname include:

 Gianfranca Gabellini (born 1938), birth name of Italian actress Scilla Gabel
 Lorenzo Gabellini (born 1999), Italian motorcycle racer
 Michael Gabellini (born 1958), American architect
 Stefano Gabellini (born 1965), Italian racing driver

Italian-language surnames